Katharina Müller-Elmau (born 13 September 1965 in Göttingen) is a German actress.

Selected filmography
  (1988)
 Japaner sind die besseren Liebhaber (1995)
 Eine ungehorsame Frau (1998, TV film)
 Marlene (2000)
 Vincent Wants to Sea (2010)
  (2014, TV film)

External links

1965 births
Living people
German film actresses
20th-century German actresses
21st-century German actresses
Actors from Göttingen